Alströmergymnasiet is a high school in Alingsås, Sweden.

Schools in Sweden